Arhopala democritus or white-dot oakblue, is a species of butterfly belonging to the lycaenid family described by Johann Christian Fabricius in 1793. It is found in  Southeast Asia (Burma, Thailand, Mergui, Indochina, Langkawi, Peninsular Malaya, Singapore, Sumatra and Borneo).

Subspecies
Arhopala democritus democritus (Burma, Thailand, Mergui, Indo China, Langkawi, northern Peninsular Malaysia)
Arhopala democritus lycaenaria (C. & R. Felder, 1860) (southern Peninsular Malaya, Singapore)
Arhopala democritus buxtoni (Hewitson, 1878) Sumatra
Arhopala democritus olinda (Druce, 1873) Borneo

References

Arhopala
Butterflies described in 1793
Taxa named by Johan Christian Fabricius
Butterflies of Asia